Loučná nad Desnou (until 1948 Vízmberk) is a municipality and village in Šumperk District in the Olomouc Region of the Czech Republic. It has about 1,500 inhabitants.

Administrative parts
Villages of Filipová, Kociánov, Kouty nad Desnou, Přemyslov and Rejhotice are administrative parts of Loučná nad Desnou.

Geography
It lies in the Hrubý Jeseník mountain range in the Desná river valley.

Notable people
Alfred Brendel (born 1931), Austrian pianist

References

Villages in Šumperk District